Small Planet Airlines Sp. z o. o. was a Polish leisure charter airline and a subsidiary of now-defunct Small Planet Airlines from Lithuania.

History
The airline was founded in December 2009 as flyLAL Charters PL Sp. z o. o., a branch of Lithuanian Airlines. In April 2009 Small Planet Airlines bought the firm from its parent company Avia Solutions Group.

In October 2018, Small Planet Airlines Poland filed for restructuring measures due to a negative financial outlook shortly after its badly managed German sister carrier declared bankruptcy. On 9 November 2018, most probably as a consequence of its sister company bankruptcy, it has been announced however that Small Planet Airlines Poland ceased its operations.

Destinations
The company flew to Spain, Tunisia, Turkey, Greece, Italy and other countries from various Polish cities, mostly Katowice and Warsaw.

Fleet

The Small Planet Airlines Poland fleet consisted of the following aircraft as of November 2018:

References

External links

 Official website

Defunct airlines of Poland
Airlines established in 2009
Airlines disestablished in 2018
Defunct charter airlines